Roberto Gastone Zeffiro Rossellini (8 May 1906 – 3 June 1977) was an Italian film director, producer, and screenwriter. He was one of the most prominent directors of the Italian neorealist cinema, contributing to the movement with films such as Rome, Open City (1945), Paisan (1946), and Germany, Year Zero (1948).

Biography

Early life 
Rossellini was born in Rome. His mother, Elettra (née Bellan), was a housewife born in Rovigo, Veneto, and his father, Angiolo Giuseppe "Peppino" Rossellini, who owned a construction firm, was born in Rome from a family originally from Pisa, Tuscany. His mother was of partial French descent, from immigrants who had arrived in Italy during the Napoleonic Wars. He lived on the Via Ludovisi, where Benito Mussolini had his first Roman hotel in 1922 when Fascism obtained power in Italy.

Rossellini's father built the first cinema in Rome, the "Barberini", a theatre where movies could be projected, granting his son an unlimited free pass; the young Rossellini started frequenting the cinema at an early age. When his father died, he worked in film sound-making and for a certain time, he experienced all the ancillary jobs related to the creation of a film, gaining competence in each field. Rossellini had a younger brother, Renzo, who later scored many of his films.

Although he wasn't personally religious, he had a strong interest in Christian values in the contemporary world; he appreciated Catholic ethics and religious sentiment—things which he saw as being neglected in the materialist world.

Career 
In 1937, Rossellini shot his first film, "Prélude à l'après-midi d'un faune", which was possibly unreleased and later lost. After this film, he was called to work as assistant director on Goffredo Alessandrini's in making Luciano Serra pilota, one of the most successful Italian films of the first half of the 20th century, and later worked on Francesco De Robertis's 1940 film Uomini sul Fondo. His close friendship with Vittorio Mussolini, son of Benito Mussolini, has been interpreted as a possible reason for having been preferred to other apprentices.

Some writers have described the first part of his career as a sequence of trilogies. His first feature film, The White Ship (1941) was sponsored by the audiovisual propaganda centre of Navy Department and is the first work in Rossellini's "Fascist Trilogy", together with A Pilot Returns (1942) and The Man with a Cross (1943). During this period he developed relationships with Federico Fellini and Aldo Fabrizi. The Fascist regime collapsed in 1943, and two months after the liberation of Rome (4 June 1944), Rossellini began preparing the anti-fascist Roma città aperta (Rome, Open City, 1945), with Fellini assisting on the script. Fabrizi played the role of the priest, while Rossellini self-produced, filming commencing in January 1945. Most of the money came from credits and loans, and film had to be found on the black market. This dramatic film was an immediate success. It has been called the first film of the Neorealist Trilogy, the second title of which was Paisà (1946), produced with non-professional actors, and the third, Germany, Year Zero (1948), was sponsored by a French producer and filmed in Berlin's French sector. In Berlin also, Rossellini preferred non-actors, but he was unable to find a face he found "interesting"; he placed his camera in the centre of a town square, as he did for Paisà, but was surprised when nobody came to watch.

As he declared in an interview "in order to really create the character that one has in mind, it is necessary for the director to engage in a battle with his actor which usually ends with submitting to the actor's wish. Since I do not have the desire to waste my energy in a battle like this, I only use professional actors occasionally". One of the reasons for success is supposed to be Rossellini's rewriting of the scripts according to the non-professional actors' feelings and histories. Regional accent, dialect, and costumes were shown in the film as they were in real life.

After his Neorealist Trilogy, Rossellini produced two films now classified as the 'Transitional films': L'Amore (1948) (with Anna Magnani) and La macchina ammazzacattivi (1952), on the capability of cinema to portray reality and truth (with recalls of commedia dell'arte). In 1948, Rossellini received a letter from a famous foreign actress proposing a collaboration:
Dear Mr. Rossellini,
I saw your films Open City and Paisan, and enjoyed them very much. If you need a Swedish actress who speaks English very well, who has not forgotten her German, who is not very understandable in French, and who in Italian knows only "ti amo," I am ready to come and make a film with you.
Ingrid Bergman

With this letter began one of the best-known love stories in film history, with Bergman and Rossellini both at the peak of their careers. Their first collaboration was Stromboli terra di Dio (1950) (in the island of Stromboli, and its volcano quite conveniently erupted during filming). This affair caused a great scandal in some countries (Bergman and Rossellini were married to other people); the scandal intensified when Bergman became pregnant with Renato Roberto Ranaldo Giusto Giuseppe ("Robin") Rossellini. Rossellini and Bergman had two more children, Isabella Rossellini (actress & model) and her twin, Ingrid Isotta. Europa '51 (1952), Siamo Donne (1953), Journey to Italy (1954), La paura (1954) and Giovanna d'Arco al rogo (1954) were the other films on which they worked together.

In 1957, Jawaharlal Nehru, the prime minister of India at the time, invited him to India to make the documentary India and put some life into the floundering Indian Films Division. Though married to Bergman, he had an affair with Sonali Senroy Dasgupta, a screenwriter, herself married to local filmmaker Harisadhan Dasgupta, who was helping develop vignettes for the film. Given the climate of the 1950s, this led to a huge scandal in India as well as in Hollywood. Nehru had to ask Rossellini to leave. Soon after, Bergman and Rossellini separated.

In 1971, Rice University in Houston, Texas, invited Rossellini to help establish a Media Center, where in 1970 he had begun planning a film on science with Rice professor Donald D. Clayton. They worked daily for two weeks in Rome in summer 1970, but financing was insufficient for filming to begin. In 1973, he was invited to teach at Yale University in New Haven, Connecticut, where he taught a one-semester course titled "The Essential Image."

Rossellini's final project was the documentary Beaubourg, filmed in 1977 and first premiered in 1983.

Personal life 
In 1934, Rossellini married Assia Noris, a Russian actress who worked in Italian films; the marriage was annulled in 1936. On 26 September 1936, he married Marcella De Marchis (17 January 1916, Rome – 25 February 2009, Sarteano), a costume designer with whom he collaborated even after their marriage was over. De Marchis and Rossellini had two sons: Marco Romano (born 3 July 1937 and died of appendicitis in 1946), and Renzo (born 24 August 1941). Rossellini and De Marchis divorced in 1950.

While filming Stromboli, Rossellini had an affair with Ingrid Bergman (who was at the time married to Petter Lindström) in 1949. In the same month the film was released, Bergman gave birth to a boy, Renato Roberto Ranaldo Giusto Giuseppe ("Robin") Rossellini (born 2 February 1950). A week after their son was born, Bergman divorced Lindström and married Rossellini in Mexico. On 18 June 1952, she gave birth to their twin daughters Isotta Ingrid Rossellini and Isabella Rossellini.

In 1957, Rossellini had an affair with Bengali screenwriter Sonali Dasgupta (née Senroy), and soon after, Bergman and Rossellini separated. Rossellini eloped with Dasgupta in 1957 when she was 27 years old. He adopted her young son Arjun, renamed Gil Rossellini (23 October 1956 – 3 October 2010), who became a New York-based film producer. Rossellini and Dasgupta had a daughter together, Raffaella Rossellini (born 1958), who is an actress and model.

In 1973, Rossellini left Dasgupta for producer Silvia D'Amico Bendicò, but he remained married to Dasgupta until his death of a heart attack at age 71 in 1977.

Legacy
Rossellini's films after his early Neo-Realist films—particularly his films with Ingrid Bergman—were commercially unsuccessful, though Journey to Italy is well regarded in some quarters. He was an acknowledged master for the critics of Cahiers du Cinéma in general and André Bazin, François Truffaut, and Jean-Luc Godard in particular. Truffaut noted in his 1963 essay, Roberto Rossellini Prefers Real Life (available in The Films in My Life) that Rossellini's influence among the directors who became part of the nouvelle vague was so great that he was in every sense "the father of the French New Wave".

His posthumous ex-son-in-law Martin Scorsese has acknowledged Rossellini's seminal influence in his documentary My Voyage to Italy (the title itself a take on Rossellini's Voyage to Italy). Among works from Italian directors Fellini, Visconti, De Sica, and Antonioni, Rossellini's films form at least half of the films Scorsese discusses, highlighting Rossellini's monumental role in Italian and world cinema. The films covered include his Neo-Realist films and films with Ingrid Bergman, as well as The Flowers of St. Francis, about St. Francis of Assisi. Scorsese notes that in contrast to directors who often become stylistically restrained and conservative as their careers advance, Rossellini became more unconventional as his career advanced, and was constantly experimenting with new styles and technical challenges. Scorsese particularly highlights the series of biographies Rossellini made in the 60s of historical figures and singles out La Prise de pouvoir par Louis XIV for praise. 

Certain of Rossellini's film-related material and personal papers are contained in the Wesleyan University Cinema Archives to which scholars and media experts from around the world may have full access. Rossellini's son Renzo is producing the Audiovisual Encyclopedia of History by Roberto Rossellini, a multi-media collection containing all of Rossellini's works, interviews, and other material from the Rossellini archive. The Encyclopedia existed in prototype form in 2011.

Filmography

 La Vispa Teresa (1939) - short
 Il Tacchino prepotente (1939) - short
 Fantasia sottomarina (1940) - short
 Il Ruscello di Ripasottile (1941) - short
 The White Ship (1941)
 A Pilot Returns (1942)
 The Man with a Cross (1943)
 Rome, Open City (1945)
 Paisà (1946)
 L'Amore (1948)
 Germany, Year Zero (1948)
 Stromboli terra di Dio (1950)
 Francesco, giullare di Dio (1950)
 "Envie, L'Envy" (segment of Les Sept péchés capitaux) (1952)
 The Machine to Kill Bad People (1952)
 Europa '51 (1952)
 "Ingrid Bergman" (segment from Siamo donne) (1953)
 "Napoli 1943" (segment from Amori di mezzo secolo) (1954)
 Dov'è la libertà...? (1954) - abandoned, completed by studio
 Viaggio in Italia (1954)
 La Paura (1954)
 Giovanna d'Arco al rogo (1954)
 India: Matri Bhumi (1959)
 Il generale Della Rovere (1959)
 Era Notte a Roma (1960)
 Viva l'Italia! (1961)
 Vanina Vanini (1961)
 Anima nera (1962)
 "Illibatezza" (segment from Ro.Go.Pa.G.) (1963)
 Da Gerusalemme a Damasco (1970)
 Anno uno (1974)
 Il messia (1975)
 Beaubourg, centre d'art et de culture Georges Pompidou (1977)

Other work 

 "Prélude à l'après-midi d'un faune" (1937) - lost project
 Desire (1946) - based on incomplete film Freight Yard
 L'Invasore (1949) - supervisor
 Rivalità (1953) - supervisor
 Benito Mussolini (1962) - producer
 Les Carabiniers (1963) - co-screenwriter
 Intervista a Salvador Allende: La forza e la ragione (1971) - interviewer

Television
Following the critical failure of Anima nera and his participation in the various artists film Ro.Go.Pa.G., Rossellini began directing films for TV in 1966 with La Prise de pouvoir par Louis XIV, and continued predominately in the medium until the end of his career in 1977.

TV films

 La Prise de pouvoir par Louis XIV (1966)
 Idea di un'isola (1967)
 Socrates (The Philosophers, 1971)
 Rice University (1971) - with Beppe Cino
 Pascal (The Philosophers, 1972)
 Agostino d'Ippona (The Philosophers, 1972)
 Cartesius (The Philosophers, 1974)
 The World Population (1974) - with Renzo Rossellini
 Concerto per Michelangelo (1977)

In addition to his TV movies, he was involved with a number of TV series, as either writer or director.

TV series

 L'India vista da Rossellini (1959) - director, mini-series
 L'Età del ferro (1964) - director, mini-series
 Atti degli apostoli (1969) - director, mini-series
 La lotta dell'uomo per la sua sopravvivenza (1970) - writer
 L'Età di Cosimo de' Medici (1973) - director, mini-series

Some sources associate Rossellini with the 1961 Torino nei cent'anni, but the status and completion of the project is unconfirmed.

Notes

External links

 
 
 New York Times: The Elusive Realism of Rossellini
 An Interview with Roberto Rossellini
 Rossellini's India at Indian Auteur
 Geographical coordinates and pictures of his grave

 
1906 births
1977 deaths
People of Tuscan descent
People of Venetian descent
English-language film directors
German-language film directors
Italian-language film directors
Nastro d'Argento winners
Rice University people
Film directors from Rome
Directors of Palme d'Or winners
Directors of Golden Lion winners
Roberto